Giulia Rodighiero is an Italian astronomer whose research concerns galaxy formation and evolution, and the effect of galactic collisions on star formation. Originally from Vicenza, she is an associate professor of physics and astronomy at the University of Padua, where she completed her PhD in 2003.

Rodighiero was the 2020 winner of the Premio Linceo per l’Astronomia of the Accademia dei Lincei, for her research on starburst galaxies. She was elected to the Academia Europaea in 2022.

References

People from Vicenza
Year of birth missing (living people)
Living people
Italian astronomers
Women astronomers
University of Padua alumni
Academic staff of the University of Padua
Members of Academia Europaea